Lino Liviabella (7 April 1902 – 21 October 1964) was an Italian composer. Liviabella was born in Macerata.  In 1936 he won a silver medal in the art competitions of the Olympic Games for his "La vittoria" ("The Victor"). He died, aged 62, in Bologna.

Selected works 
Chamber music

 Sonata No. 1 in A minor for violin and piano (1920–1928)
 Natale, Suite for violin and piano (1923)
 Sonatina per l'Elevazione for violin and harmonium (1924)
 Canzonetta for violin and piano (1925)
 Aria for violin and organ or harmonium (1925)
 String Quartet No. 1 (1926)
 Danza for violin solo (1926)
 Adagio for oboe and piano (1926)
 S. Francesco, Meditazione for viola, 2 violins, double bass and organ (1926)
 Due espressioni liriche (2 Lyric Expressions) for string quartet (1927)
 Preludio in modo minore for 2 violins, cello and harmonium (1928)
 String Quartet No. 2 (1929)
 Bululù, Marionetta meccanica del romanzo “Eva ultima” di Massimo Bontempelli for violin and piano (1930)
 Canto andaluso for violin and piano (1930)
 Sonata ciclica for cello and piano (1931)
 Sonata No. 2 in One Movement for violin and piano (1932)
 Lento for flute, 2 violins, piano and harp
 Sonata No. 3 in One Movement for violin and piano (1934)
 Largo for cello and piano (1936)
 Canto per la Prima Comunione di Laura e Lucio for violin and harmonium (1942)
 Pastorale for violin or oboe and piano (1943)
 Lucio e Renato, Marcetta for violin and piano (1944)
 Scherzo for oboe and piano (1948)
 String Quartet No. 3 in One Movement (1948)
 Piano Trio (1948)
 Sonata No. 1 in One Movement (Prima Sonata in un tempo) for viola and piano (1950)
 Divertimento for flute, violin, viola, cello and harp (1950–1953)
 Divertimento for flute, cello and piano (1954)
 String Quartet No. 4 "La melanconia" (1955)
 Concerto in One Movement for violin and piano (1956)
 Tre momenti (3 Moments) for viola and piano (1956)
 Tre pezzi (3 Pieces) for flute and harp or piano (1956)
 Tre pezzi (3 Pieces) for flute, oboe, and harp or piano (1956)
 Sette duetti miniatura (7 Miniature Duets) for violin and viola (1957)
 Sonata No. 2 for viola and piano (1957)
 Quattro brani nuziali (4 Wedding Songs) for viola and organ or harmonium (1961)

 Operas
 Santina (1922)
 Zanira (1924)
 Antigone (1942)
 La Conchiglia (1955)
 Canto di Natale (1963)

References

External links
 
 profile

1902 births
1964 deaths
Italian male composers
Olympic silver medalists in art competitions
People from Macerata
20th-century Italian composers
Medalists at the 1936 Summer Olympics
20th-century Italian male musicians
Olympic competitors in art competitions